Rowe is a census-designated place (CDP) in San Miguel County, New Mexico, United States.

Demographics

Description

Rowe was established to provide labor for the Santa Fe Railroad in the late 1870s and early 1880s. A pipeline to provide water for steam engines was laid between Rowe and the then village of Las Ruedas. Las Ruedas ceased to exist and by the time of the 1880 U.S. Federal Census most of the former residents of Las Ruedas were resettled in Rowe.

The old Las Ruedas townsite is privately owned.

Education
It is within Pecos Independent Schools.

 a bookmobile served the community but it had no permanent library facility.

The Native American Preparatory School operated in the nearby area, in proximity to South San Ysidro, from 1995 until it closed in 2002.

See also

 List of census-designated places in New Mexico

References

External links

 Hometownlocator.com entry
  USBeacon.com entry

Census-designated places in San Miguel County, New Mexico
Census-designated places in New Mexico